
Zapaleri Lake is a lake in the Sur Lípez Province, Potosí Department, Bolivia. At an elevation of 4608 m, its surface area is 2 km².

References 

Lakes of Potosí Department